Dhanpat Rai Srivastava (31 July 1880 – 8 October 1936), better known by his pen name Premchand, was an Indian writer famous for his modern Hindustani literature. Premchand was a pioneer of Hindi and Urdu social fiction. He was one of the first authors to write about caste hierarchies and the plights of women and labourers prevalent in the society of late 1880s. He is one of the most celebrated writers of the Indian subcontinent, and is regarded as one of the foremost Hindi writers of the early twentieth century. His works include Godaan, Karmabhoomi, Gaban, Mansarovar, Idgah. He published his first collection of five short stories in 1907 in a book called Soz-e-Watan.

He began writing under the pen name "Nawab Rai", but subsequently switched to "Premchand". A novel writer, story writer and dramatist, he has been referred to as the "Upanyas Samrat" (Emperor Among Novelists) by Hindi writers. His works include more than a dozen novels, around 300 short stories, several essays and translations of a number of foreign literary works into Hindi

Biography

Early life

Premchand was born Dhanpat Rai on 31 July 1880 in Lamhi, a village located near Banaras, and was named Dhanpat Rai ("master of wealth"). His ancestors came from a large Kayastha family, which owned eight to nine bighas of land. His grandfather, Guru Sahai Rai was a patwari (village land record-keeper), and his father Ajaib Lal was a post office clerk. His mother was Anandi Devi of Karauni village, who probably was also his inspiration for the character Anandi in his "Bade Ghar Ki Beti". Dhanpat Rai was the fourth child of Ajaib Lal and Anandi; the first two were girls who died as infants, and the third one was a girl named Suggi. His uncle, Mahabir, a rich landowner, nicknamed him "Nawab", meaning baron. "Nawab Rai" was the first pen name chosen by Dhanpat Rai.

When he was 7 years old, Dhanpat Rai began his education at a madrasa in Lalpur, Varanasi, located near Lamhi. He learned Urdu and Persian from a maulvi in the madrasa. When he was 8, his mother died after a long illness. His grandmother, who was responsible for raising him, died soon after. Premchand felt isolated, as his elder sister Suggi had already been married, and his father was always busy with work. His father, who was now posted at Gorakhpur, remarried but Premchand received little affection from his stepmother. The stepmother later became a recurring theme in Premchand's works.

As a child, Dhanpat Rai sought solace in fiction, and developed a fascination for books. He heard the stories of the Persian-language fantasy epic Tilism-e-Hoshruba at a tobacconist's shop. He took the job of selling books for a book wholesaler, thus getting the opportunity to read a lot of books. He learnt English at a missionary school, and studied several works of fiction including George W. M. Reynolds's eight-volume The Mysteries of the Court of London. He composed his first literary work at Gorakhpur, which was never published and is now lost. It was a farce on a bachelor, who falls in love with a low-caste woman. The character was based on Premchand's uncle, who used to scold him for being obsessed with reading fiction; the farce was probably written as a revenge for this.

After his father was posted to Jamania in the mid-1890s, Dhanpat Rai enrolled at the Queen's College at Banaras as a day scholar. In 1895, he was married at the age of 15, while still studying in the ninth grade. The match was arranged by his maternal step-grandfather. The girl was from a rich landlord family and was older than Premchand, who found her quarrelsome and not good-looking.

His father died in 1897 after a long illness. He managed to pass the matriculation exam with second division (below 60% marks). However, only the students with first division were given fee concessions at the Queen's College. He then sought admission at the Central Hindu School, but was unsuccessful because of his poor arithmetic skills. Thus, he had to discontinue his studies. He then obtained an assignment to coach an advocate's son in Banaras at a monthly salary of five rupees. He used to reside in a mud cell over the advocate's stables and used to send 60% of his salary back home. Premchand read a lot during these days. After racking up several debts, in 1899, he once went to a bookshop to sell one of his collected books.

Three months later, he was transferred to the District School in Pratapgarh, where he stayed in an administrator's bungalow and tutored his son.

Dhanpat Rai first wrote under the pseudonym "Nawab Rai". His first short novel was Asrar-e-Ma'abid ("Secrets of God's abode", Devasthan Rahasya in Hindi), which explores corruption among the temple priests and their sexual exploitation of poor women. The novel was published in a series in the Banaras-based Urdu weekly Awaz-e-Khalk from 8 October 1903 to February 1905. Literary critic Siegfried Schulz states that "his inexperience is quite evident in his first novel", which is not well-organized, lacks a good plot and features stereotyped characters. Prakash Chandra Gupta calls it an "immature work", which shows a tendency to "see life only black or white".

Stay at Kanpur 
From Pratapgarh, Dhanpat Rai was relocated to Allahabad for training, and subsequently posted at Kanpur in 1905. He stayed in Kanpur for around four years, from May 1905 to June 1909. There he met Munshi Daya Narain Nigam, the editor of the Urdu magazine Zamana, in which he later published several articles and stories.

Premchand visited his village Lamhi during the summer vacation, but did not find the stay enjoyable because of a number of reasons. He did not find the weather or the atmosphere conducive for writing. Plus, he faced domestic trouble due to quarrels between his wife and his step-mother. Premchand angrily scolded his wife, after she unsuccessfully tried to commit suicide by hanging. Dismayed, she went to her father's house, and Premchand displayed no interest in bringing her back. In 1906, Premchand married a child widow, Shivarani Devi, who was the daughter of a landlord from a village near Fatehpur. The step was considered to be revolutionary at that time, and Premchand faced a lot of social opposition. After his death, Shivarani Devi wrote a book on him, titled Premchand Ghar Mein ("Premchand in House").

In 1905, inspired by the nationalist activism, Premchand published an article on the Indian National Congress leader Gopal Krishna Gokhale in Zamana. He criticised Gokhale's methods for achieving political freedom, and instead recommended adoption of more extremist measures adopted by Bal Gangadhar Tilak. Premchand's first published story was "Duniya ka Sabse Anmol Ratan" ("The Most Precious Jewel in the World"), which appeared in Zamana in 1907. According to this story, the most precious 'jewel' was the last drop of blood necessary to attain independence. Many of Premchand's early short stories had patriotic overtones, influenced by the Indian independence movement.

Premchand's second short novel Hamkhurma-o-Hamsavab (Prema in Hindi), published in 1907, was penned under the name "Babu Nawab Rai Banarsi". It explores the issue of widow remarriage in the contemporary conservative society: the protagonist Amrit Rai overcomes social opposition to marry the young widow Poorna, giving up his rich and beautiful fiancée Prema. According to Prakash Chandra Gupta, "while containing seeds of his future greatness in many ways, the novel is still youthful and lacks the discipline which full maturity brings".

In 1907, another of Premchand's short novels, Kishna was published by the Medical Hall Press of Banaras. This 142-page work, which satirises women's fondness for jewellery, is now lost. Literary critic Nobat Rai criticised the work in Zamana, calling it a mockery of the women's conditions.

During April–August 1907, Premchand's novel Roothi Rani was published in serial form in Zamana. Also in 1907, the publishers of Zamana published Premchand's first short story collection, titled Soz-e-Watan. The collection, which was later banned, contained four stories which sought to inspire the Indians in their struggle for political freedom.

Adoption of the name Premchand 
In 1909, Premchand was transferred to Mahoba, and later posted to Hamirpur as the Sub-deputy Inspector of Schools. Around this time, Soz-e-Watan was noticed by the British Government officials, who banned it as a seditious work. James Samuel Stevenson, the British collector of Hamirpur district ordered a raid on Premchand's house, where around five hundred copies of Soz-e-Watan were burnt. After this, Munshi Daya Narain Nigam, the editor of the Urdu magazine Zamana, who had published Dhanpat Rai's first story "Duniya ka Sabse Anmol Ratan" advised the pseudonym "Premchand". Dhanpat Rai stopped using the name "Nawab Rai" and became Premchand.

In 1914, Munshi Premchand started writing in Hindi (Hindi and Urdu are considered different registers of a single language Hindustani, with Hindi drawing much of its vocabulary from Sanskrit and Urdu being more influenced by Persian). By this time, he was already reputed as a fiction writer in Urdu. Sumit Sarkar notes that the switch was prompted by the difficulty of finding publishers in Urdu. His first Hindi story "Saut" was published in the magazine Saraswati in December 1915, and his first short story collection Sapta Saroj was published in June 1917.

Gorakhpur 

In August 1916, Premchand was transferred to Gorakhpur on a promotion. He became the Assistant Master at the Normal High School, Gorakhpur.

At Gorakhpur, he developed a friendship with the bookseller Buddhi Lal, who allowed him to borrow novels for reading, in exchange for selling exam cram books at the school. Premchand was an enthusiastic reader of classics in other languages, and translated several of these works in Hindi.

By 1919, Premchand had published four novels, of about a hundred pages each. In 1919, Premchand's first major novel Seva Sadan was published in Hindi. The novel was originally written in Urdu under the title Bazaar-e-Husn, but was published in Hindi first by a Calcutta-based publisher, who offered Premchand  for his work. The Urdu Publisher of Lahore published the novel later in 1924, paying Premchand . The novel tells the story of an unhappy housewife, who first becomes a courtesan, and then manages an orphanage for the young daughters of the courtesans. It was well received by the critics, and helped Premchand gain wider recognition.

In 1919, Premchand obtained a BA degree from Allahabad University. By 1921, he had been promoted to Deputy Inspectors of Schools. On 8 February 1921, he attended a meeting in Gorakhpur, where Mahatma Gandhi asked people to resign from government jobs as part of the non-cooperation movement. Premchand, although physically unwell and with two kids and a pregnant wife to support, thought about it for 5 days and decided, with the consent of his wife, to resign from his government job.

Back to Banaras 
After quitting his job, Premchand left Gorakhpur for Banaras on 18 March 1921, and decided to focus on his literary career. Till his death in 1936, he faced severe financial difficulties and chronic ill health.

In 1923, he established a printing press and publishing house in Banaras, christened "Saraswati Press". The year 1924 saw the publication of Premchand's Rangbhoomi, which has a blind beggar called Surdas as its tragic hero. Schulz mentions that in Rangbhoomi, Premchand comes across as a "superb social chronicler", and although the novel contains some "structural flaws" and "too many authorial explanations", it shows a "marked progress" in Premchand's writing style. According to Schulz, it was in Nirmala (1925) and Pratigya (1927) that Premchand found his way to "a balanced, realistic level" that surpasses his earlier works and manages to "hold his readers in tutelage". Nirmala, a novel dealing with the dowry system in India, was first serialised in the magazine Chand between November 1925 and November 1926, before being published as a novel. Pratigya ("The Vow") dealt with the subject of widow remarriage.

In 1928, Premchand's novel Gaban ("Embezzlement"), focusing on the middle class' greed, was published. In March 1930, Premchand launched a literary-political weekly magazine titled Hans, aimed at inspiring the Indians to mobilise against the British rule. The magazine, noted for its politically provocative views, failed to make a profit. Premchand then took over and edited another magazine called Jagaran, which too ran at a loss.

In 1931, Premchand moved to Kanpur as a teacher in the Marwari College, but had to leave because of difference with the college administration. He then returned to Banaras, and became the editor of the Maryada magazine. In 1932, he published another novel titled Karmabhoomi. He briefly served as the headmaster of the Kashi Vidyapeeth, a local school. After the school's closure, he became the editor of the Madhuri magazine in Lucknow.

Bombay 
Premchand arrived in Bombay on 31 May 1934 to try his luck in the Hindi film industry. He had accepted a script writing job for the production house Ajanta Cinetone, hoping that the yearly salary of  would help him overcome his financial troubles. He stayed in Dadar, and wrote the script for the film Mazdoor ("The Labourer"). The film, directed by Mohan Bhawnani, depicted the poor conditions on the labour class. Premchand himself did a cameo as the leader of labourers in the film. Some influential businessmen managed to get a stay on its release in Bombay. The film was released in Lahore and Delhi, but was banned again after it inspired the mill workers to stand up against the owners.

Ironically, the film inspired the workers of his own loss-making press in Banaras to launch a strike, after they were not paid their salaries. Meanwhile, Premchand was beginning to dislike the non-literary commercial environment of the Bombay film industry, and wanted to return to Banaras. However, he had signed a one-year contract with the production house. He ultimately left Bombay on 4 April 1935, before the completion of one year. Himanshu Roy, the founder of Bombay Talkies, tried to convince Premchand to stay back, but did not succeed.

Last days 

After leaving Bombay, Premchand wanted to settle in Allahabad, where his sons Sripat Rai and Amrit Kumar Rai were studying. He also planned to publish Hans from there. However, owing to his financial situation and ill-health, he had to hand over Hans to the Indian Literary Counsel and move to Banaras.

Premchand was elected as the first President of the Progressive Writers' Association in Lucknow, in 1936. He died on 8 October 1936, after several days of sickness and while still in office.

Godaan (The Gift of a Cow, 1936), Premchand's last completed work, is generally accepted as his best novel, and is considered one of the finest Hindi novels. The protagonist, Hori, a poor peasant, desperately longs for a cow, a symbol of wealth and prestige in rural India. According to Siegfried Schulz, "Godān is a well-structured and well-balanced novel which amply fulfils the literary requirements postulated by Western literary standards." Unlike other contemporary renowned authors such as Rabindranath Tagore, Premchand was not appreciated much outside India. Schulz believes that the reason for this was absence of good translations of his work. Also, unlike Tagore and Iqbal, Premchand never travelled outside India, studied abroad or mingled with the renowned foreign literary figures.

In 1936, Premchand also published "Kafan" ("Shroud"), in which a poor man collects money for the funeral rites of his dead wife, but spends it on food and drink. Premchand's last published story was "Cricket Match", which appeared in Zamana in 1938, after his death.

Style and influences 

Premchand is considered the first Hindi author whose writings prominently featured realism. His novels describe the problems of the poor and the urban middle-class. His works depict a rationalistic outlook, which views religious values as something that allows the powerful hypocrites to exploit the weak. He used literature for the purpose of arousing public awareness about national and social issues and often wrote about topics related to corruption, child widowhood, prostitution, feudal system, poverty, colonialism and on the Indian independence movement.

Premchand started taking an interest in political affairs while at Kanpur during the late 1900s, and this is reflected in his early works, which have patriotic overtones. His political thoughts were initially influenced by the moderate Indian National Congress leader Gopal Krishna Gokhale, but later, he moved towards the more extremist Bal Gangadhar Tilak. He considered the Minto–Morley Reforms and the Montagu–Chelmsford Reforms as inadequate, and supported greater political freedom. Several of his early works, such as A Little Trick and A Moral Victory, satirised the Indians who cooperated with the British Government. He did not specifically mention the British in some of his stories, because of strong government censorship, but disguised his opposition in settings from the medieval era and the foreign history. He was also influenced by the teachings of Swami Vivekananda.

In the 1920s, he was influenced by Mahatma Gandhi's non-co-operation movement and the accompanying struggle for social reform. During this period, his works dealt with the social issues such as poverty, zamindari exploitation (Premashram, 1922), dowry system (Nirmala, 1925), educational reform and political oppression (Karmabhoomi, 1931). Premchand was focused on the economic liberalisation of the peasantry and the working class, and was opposed to the rapid industrialisation, which he felt would hurt the interests of the peasants and lead to oppression of the workers. This can be seen in works like Rangbhoomi (1924).

Premchand's influence on Indian literature cannot be overstated. As the late scholar David Rubin wrote in The World of Premchand (1969), "To Premchand belongs the distinction of creating the genre of the serious short story—and the serious novel as well—in both Hindi and Urdu. Virtually single-handed he lifted fiction in these languages from a quagmire of aimless romantic chronicles to a high level of realistic narrative comparable to European fiction of the time; and in both languages, he has, in addition, remained an unsurpassed master."

In his last days, he focused on village life as a stage for complex drama, as seen in the novel Godaan (1936) and the short-story collection Kafan (1936). Premchand believed that social realism was the way for Hindi literature, as opposed to the "feminine quality", tenderness and emotion of the contemporary Bengali literature.

Legacy 
Premchand was commemorated with the issue of a special 30-paise postage stamp by India Post on 31 July 1980.

Premchand's ancestral house in Lamhi is being restored by the state government. An institute has also been set up in Lamhi to study his work. The Munshi Premchand Mahavidyalaya in Siliguri has been named after him.

On 31 July 2016, Google showed a Google Doodle in honouring the 136th birthday of Premchand.

List of works 

Premchand wrote over three hundred short stories and fourteen novels, many essays and letters, plays and translations. Many of Premchand's works were translated into English and Russian after his death.

Novels

Short stories 
Several of Premchand's stories have been published in a number of collections, including the 8-volume Mansarovar (1900–1936). Some of his stories include:

Other stories include:

Translations 
Premchand translated several non-Hindi works into Hindi. These included the writings of Ratan Nath Dhar Sarshar, Leo Tolstoy (The Story of Richard Doubledick), Oscar Wilde (Canterville), John Galsworthy (Strife), Saadi Shirazi, Guy de Maupassant, Maurice Maeterlinck (The Sightless) and Hendrik Willem van Loon (The Story of Mankind).

Some of the translated titles include:

Other 
Film script

 Mill (Mazdoor), (1934)
This is the only film written by the acclaimed writer Munshi Premchand in which he also played a cameo. The film courted controversy owing to its story of a prodigal son of a benevolent mill worker who inherits the mill and proceeds to treat its workers with disdain.

Plays
 Karbala
 Tajurba
 Prem ki Vedi	
 Roohani Shadi
 Sangram

Essays
 Kuchh Vichar (two parts)
 Qalam Tyag aur Talwar

Biographies
 Durgadas
 Mahatma Sheikhsadi (biography of Saadi)

Children's books
 Bal Kahaniyan Sumpurn
 Manmodak
 Ram Charcha

Adaptations of Premchand's works 

Sevasadanam (1938) was made into a film with M. S. Subbulakshmi in the lead role. The novel is set in Varanasi, the holy city of Hindus. Sevasadan ("House of Service") is an institute built for the daughters of courtesans. The lead of the novel is a beautiful, intelligent and talented girl called Suman. She belongs to a high caste. She is married to a much older, tyrannical man. She realises that a loveless marriage is just like prostitution except that there is only one client. Bholi, a courtesan, lives opposite Suman. Suman realises that Bholi is "outside purdah", while she is "inside it". Suman leaves her husband and becomes a successful entertainer of gentlemen. But after a brief period of success, she ends up as a victim of a political drama played out by self-righteous Hindu social reformers and moralists.

A film version of Premchand's novel, Gaban, was released in 1966. Sunil Dutt, Sadhana Shivdasani, Kanhaiyalal and Leela Mishra acted in the film and the music was scored by musician duo Shankar–Jaikishan. Heera Moti, a 1959 Indian Hindi-language film directed by Krishan Chopra, was based on Premchand's "Do Bailon ki Katha".

In 1977, Satyajit Ray made a film based on Premchand's short story "Shatranj ke Khiladi" ("The Chess Players"), which won the National Film Award for Best Feature Film in Hindi. The film revolves around the decadence of nawabi Lucknow, where the obsession with a game consumes the players, making them oblivious of their responsibilities in the midst of a crisis.

Oka Oori Katha (A Story of a Village) is a 1977 Telugu film directed by Mrinal Sen. It is based on the story "Kafan" by Munshi Premchand. It is one of the few art films made in the Telugu language.

Indian film director Satyen Bose adapted Premchand's "Panch Parmeshwar" into the 1979 film Saanch Ko Aanch Nahin. Bazaar E Husn, a 2014 Indian Hindi-language film was based on Premchand's novel of the same name. A 2019 Indian film, Ek Betuke Aadmi Ki Afrah Raatein, was based on Fyodor Dostoevsky's "White Nights" and "The Dream of a Ridiculous Man", and Premchand's "Bhoot".

At least three television series based on Premchand's works have been aired by the Indian national public broadcaster Doordarshan on DD National which include Munshi Premchand's Guldasta, Munshi Premchand ki Kahani, and Tehreer Munshi Premchand Ki. The television films Sadgati (based on a Premchand short story) and Seva Sadan (based on Bazaar-e-Husn) were also aired by Doordarshan.

Notes

References

Further reading

External links 

 Kavishala Sootradhar | Munshi Premchand

 
1880 births
1936 deaths
19th-century Indian novelists
19th-century Indian short story writers
19th-century pseudonymous writers
20th-century Indian novelists
20th-century Indian screenwriters
20th-century Indian short story writers
20th-century pseudonymous writers
20th-century Urdu-language writers
Hindi-language writers
Hindi novelists
Indian magazine founders
Indian magazine editors
Indian male novelists
Indian male screenwriters
Novelists from Uttar Pradesh
Writers in British India
University of Allahabad alumni
Urdu-language novelists
Urdu-language short story writers
Urdu-language writers from British India
Writers from Varanasi